Seán Ó Cearnaigh is an Irish academic and scholar. He taught at the Dublin Institute for Advanced Studies from 1990–94, and has published books on the Irish language.

Bibliography
 An Stad: croílár na hAthbheochana, Comhar, 1993. 
 Éigse Éireann/Poetry Ireland Review 39 - Eagrán Speisialta Gaeilge, 1993. 
 Scríbhneoirí na Gaeilge 1945-1995, Comhar, 1995.
 Lux Aeterna agus Dánta Eile, Eoghan Ó Tuairisc (editor), Cois Life, 2000
 A New View of the Irish Language (edited with Caoilfhionn Nic Pháidín), Cois Life, 2000.
 "The Reformation and the Irish Book: 1567-1645" in The Printed Book in Irish: 1557-2000, Oxford, 2014

External links
 http://www.coislife.ie/udar/102/sean-o-cearnaigh
 http://www.smo.uhi.ac.uk/~oduibhin/mcq/ulsterirish.htm
 http://www.arts.ulster.ac.uk/aich/hib/vol2/hibvol2.pdf
 http://www.persee.fr/doc/irlan_0183-973x_2008_num_33_2_1850_t1_0181_0000_2

Academics of the Dublin Institute for Advanced Studies
Irish-language writers
Year of birth missing (living people)
Living people
20th-century Irish writers
21st-century Irish writers